In Greek mythology, Calydon (Ancient Greek: Καλυδὼν) was the eponymous ruler of Calydon, a city in Aetolia.

Family 
Calydon was a son of King Aetolus and Pronoe, daughter of Phorbus, and the brother of Pleuron. He married Aeolia, daughter of Amythaon, and had by her two daughters: Protogeneia, who consorted with Ares, and Epicaste, who wed her cousin Agenor.

Family tree

Notes

References 

 Apollodorus, The Library with an English Translation by Sir James George Frazer, F.B.A., F.R.S. in 2 Volumes, Cambridge, MA, Harvard University Press; London, William Heinemann Ltd. 1921. ISBN 0-674-99135-4. Online version at the Perseus Digital Library. Greek text available from the same website.
 Stephanus of Byzantium, Stephani Byzantii Ethnicorum quae supersunt, edited by August Meineike (1790-1870), published 1849. A few entries from this important ancient handbook of place names have been translated by Brady Kiesling. Online version at the Topos Text Project.

Princes in Greek mythology
Kings in Greek mythology
Family of Calyce
Aetolian characters in Greek mythology